These are the official results of the Women's high jump event at the 1986 European Championships in Stuttgart, West Germany, held at Neckarstadion on 27 and 28 August 1986.

Medalists

Results

Qualification
27 August

Final
28 August

Participation
According to an unofficial count, 22 athletes from 11 countries participated in the event.

 (1)
 (2)
 (2)
 (3)
 (2)
 (1)
 (2)
 (3)
 (2)
 (3)
 (1)

See also
 1980 Women's Olympic High Jump (Moscow)
 1982 Women's European Championships High Jump (Athens)
 1983 Women's World Championships High Jump (Helsinki)
 1984 Women's Olympic High Jump (Los Angeles)
 1987 Women's World Championships High Jump (Rome)
 1988 Women's Olympic High Jump (Seoul)
 1990 Women's European Championships High Jump (Split)

References

 Results

High jump
High jump at the European Athletics Championships
1986 in women's athletics